Recuerdos de la Alhambra (Memories of the Alhambra) is a classical guitar piece composed in Málaga by Spanish composer and guitarist Francisco Tárrega. It requires the tremolo technique and is often performed by advanced players.

The piece was written for and dedicated to Tárrega's patron Concepción Gómez de Jacoby in 1899, commemorating their visit to the Alhambra palace and fortress complex in Granada, Spain. It was originally titled Improvisación ¡A Granada! Cantiga Árabe. It became known through an early 20th-century publication edited by Tárrega and dedicated as an homage to the French guitarist Alfred Cottin.

Performance notes
The piece showcases a challenging guitar tremolo, wherein a single melody note is plucked consecutively by the ring, middle and index fingers in such rapid succession that the result is an illusion of one long sustained note. The thumb plays an arpeggio-pattern accompaniment simultaneously. Many who have heard the piece but not seen it performed mistake it for a duet.

The A-section of the piece is written in A-minor and the B-section is written in the parallel major (A-major).

Arrangements

Ruggiero Ricci arranged this piece for solo violin, and often performed it as an encore.

Nana Mouskouri has performed a vocal version and Sarah Brightman has performed a re-adapted vocal version in her album Classics.

Chris Freeman and John Shaw recorded a non-vocal version for their album Chris Freeman and John Shaw (May 1981).

Luiza Borac has arranged this piece for solo piano on her 2014 CD "Chants Nostalgiques" (Avie AV-2316).

Xavi Ganjam made a special arrangement for sitar on his EP 'Soham' (2019)

Alex Jacobowitz frequently performs a version of Recuerdos de la Alhambra at his Marimba / Xylophone. When he plays it at his concerts he starts the performance usually with a message for a peaceful coexistence of people with different religions and nationalities. (The building of the Alhambra was undertaken by a team comprising Muslims, Jews, and Christians.) He recorded it also for some of his CDs: Spanish Rosewood - the music of Spain, The Art of Xylos  and Aria.

There are also choral and orchestral arrangements of this piece.

Soundtrack use
Recuerdos de la Alhambra has been used as title or incidental music several times, including the soundtrack for René Clément's Forbidden Games (as played by Narciso Yepes), for The Killing Fields (under the title Étude as performed by Mike Oldfield), and in the films Sideways and Margaret.

Performed and arranged by Jonathon Coudrille, it was used as the title music for the British television series Out of Town and a version performed by Pepe Romero was used as incidental music in The Sopranos episode "Luxury Lounge." Gideon Coe on BBC Radio 6Music uses this tune as a musical background at approximately the half-way point of his evening weekday show. A sung version appears in the Studio Ghibli film When Marnie Was There.

It is also the theme used for Philip II of Spain in the 4X strategy game Civilization VI, with the track progressing from a simple guitar arrangement to an entire orchestral performance as Spain advances through the ages.

The theme was part of the soundtrack and storyline for the eponymous 2018 Korean television series Memories of the Alhambra.

References

External links
 
 

Compositions for guitar
Compositions by Francisco Tárrega
1896 compositions